Sorbet is a frozen dessert made using ice combined with fruit juice, fruit purée, or other ingredients, such as wine, liqueur, or honey. Generally, sorbets do not contain dairy products, while sherbets do.

Etymology
The word "sorbet" entered the English language from French, derived from the Italian sorbetto, which in turn came from the Ottoman Turkish or Iranian sharbat, originally referring to a type of beverage. The word sharbat is derived from the Arabic verb "shariba", which means "to drink".

Sherbet in Europe still refers to a type of flavored drink, while North American sherbet is similar to sorbet. August Escoffier describes sorbet as "very light and barely-congealed ices, served after the Entrées. They serve in freshening the stomach; preparing it to properly receive the roast. They are appetizers and help to aid digestion". Sorbet is sometimes referred to as "water ice".

Oxford English Dictionary defines sorbet as an alternate term sharing the same meaning as sherbet, a beverage. The usage of "sorbet" to describe a beverage is attested to in the English language literature in the 16ths and 17th centuries. A 17th century text describes sorbetta as "a kinde of drinke made of Water, Suger, and iuyce of Lemonds, mixed with Amber and Muske". The term was still being used for drinks in the 19th century: "They resorted to drink coffee and sorbet, with laughter and merriment".

History
It is believed that sorbets originated in ancient Persia as far back as 550-530 BCE.

There are a number of legendary origin myths, unsupported by any known evidence, that attribute the origins of sorbet to historical figures like the Roman Emperor Nero, Marco Polo and the Italian duchess Catherine de' Medici.

Romans did not add ice to their drinks because easily accessible ice along the lower slopes of mountains was not sanitary for use in food preparation. Iced drinks were believed to cause convulsions, colic and a host of other ailments. Hippocrates was known to have criticized chilled drinks for causing "fluxes of the stomach", while Seneca lambasted the extravagant costs associated with iced desserts. Despite this, ice and snow were prized ingredients in ancient cuisines including Japanese, Chinese, Greek and Roman cuisines.

The first Western mention of sherbet is an Italian reference to something that Turks drink. The word sherbet entered the Italian language as sorbetto, which later became sorbet in French. August Escoffier describes sorbet as "very light and barely-congealed ices, served after the Entrées. They serve in freshening the stomach; preparing it to properly receive the roast. They are appetizers and help to aid digestion". He recommends that they register 15° on the saccharometer and be of drinkable consistency.

The first recipe in French for flavored ices appears in 1674, in Nicholas Lemery's Recueil de curiositéz rares et nouvelles de plus admirables effets de la nature. Recipes for sorbetti saw publication in the 1694 edition of Antonio Latini's Lo Scalco alla Moderna (The Modern Steward). Recipes for flavored ices begin to appear in François Massialot's Nouvelle Instruction pour les Confitures, les Liqueurs, et les Fruits, starting with the 1692 edition. Massialot's recipes result in a coarse, pebbly texture. Latini claims that the results of his recipes should have the fine consistency of sugar and snow. When Europeans figured out how to freeze sherbet they began making sorbetto by adding fruit juices and flavorings to a frozen simple syrup base. In the US sherbet generally meant an ice milk, but recipes from early soda fountain manuals include ingredients such as gelatin, beaten egg whites, cream, or milk.

Preparation
Like granitas and other ices, sorbet can be made without an ice cream maker. Alcohol, honey or corn syrup can be added to lower the freezing point and make softer sorbets.

Sorbet is usually made with fresh fruit and simple syrup, but other types of preparations exist. Tart sorbets are served as palate cleansers between savory courses of a meal. Mulled wine sorbet can be made with red wine, orange, lemons, mulling spices, ruby port, and egg whites. Muscat sorbet is made with dessert wine, lemon juice, and egg whites. 

Givré (French for "frosted") is the term for a sorbet served in a frozen coconut shell or hollowed-out fruit, such as a lemon. Agraz is a type of sorbet with an acidic flavor attributed by Larousse Gastronomique to the Maghreb region of North Africa. It is made from almonds, verjuice, and sugar.

See also

Frozen dessert
Italian ice
Ice cream
Gelato
Iranian cuisine

References

Bibliography

 
Frozen desserts
Iranian desserts
Italian cuisine
Vegan cuisine